Sandy Dujardin (born 29 May 1997) is a French cyclist, who currently rides for UCI ProTeam .

Major results

Road

2014
 1st Mountains classification, Ain'Ternational-Rhône Alpes-Valromey Tour
2021
 10th Overall Tour d'Eure-et-Loir
2022
 Tour du Rwanda
1st  Sprints classification
1st Stage 1
 3rd La Roue Tourangelle
 6th Grand Prix de Denain
 6th Druivenkoers Overijse
 7th Paris–Tours
 9th Paris–Chauny

Cyclo-cross
2014–2015
 1st Overall Junior Coupe de France
1st Sisteron
2nd Lanarvily
 1st Nommay Juniors
2018–2019
 3rd National Under-23 Championships
 Under-23 Coupe de France
3rd Razès

References

External links

1997 births
Living people
French male cyclists
People from Mont-Saint-Aignan
Cyclo-cross cyclists
Cyclists from Normandy
Sportspeople from Seine-Maritime